Pride of workmanship is the gratifying sense of having done good work. It is an element of job satisfaction. 

One of the key principles in the philosophy of management consultant W. Edwards Deming is that workers have a right to pride of workmanship:

12a. Remove barriers that rob the hourly worker of his right to pride of workmanship. The responsibility of supervisors must be changed from sheer numbers to quality.

b. Remove barriers that rob people in management and in engineering of their right to pride of workmanship. This means, inter alia, abolishment of the annual or merit rating and of management by objective.

In Out of the Crisis (1982), Deming argues that pride of workmanship is more important to workers than "gymnasiums, tennis courts, and recreation areas," and that barriers to pride of workmanship are a major obstacle to cost reduction and quality improvement.

Economist Thorstein Veblen advocated transferring control of industry from financial and business people to engineers, who were most likely to be driven by pride of workmanship and curiosity.

During the Industrial Revolution, the factory system destroyed the workers' traditional way of life, depriving them of pride of workmanship, among other things. In the late 18th and early 19th centuries, workers responded by destroying machines and factories in what were called the Luddite revolts.

References

Citations

Bibliography

External links
The Vine Sprouts Employee Program

Industrial Revolution
Quality
Pride
Industrial and organizational psychology
Employee relations
Organizational behavior